Jean-Pierre Papin (born 5 November 1963) is a French football manager and former professional player who played as a forward who is the current technical advisor of french Ligue 1 Marseille.

Considered to be one of the best French centre-forwards, he won the Ballon d'Or in 1991. He was included in the FIFA 100, a list of the greatest living footballers, published in 2004 for the centenary of the International Association Football Federation (FIFA), signed by Pelé. He was named one of the best European footballers on the occasion of the fiftieth anniversary of the Union of European Football Associations (UEFA) in 2004. He is famous in particular for his long shots in first intention, his acrobatic return and his recovery volleys which are known as papinade. The nickname of JPP is attributed to him by supporters and journalists.

Trained at Jeumont, he signed his first professional contract in 1984 at Valenciennes FC. Recruited by Club Brugge, he had an excellent season, winning the Belgian Cup and being selected for the French team for the 1986 World Cup. Recruited by Marseille, he experienced the peak of his career and won with the Marseille club, the French Championship in 1989, 1990, 1991 and 1992, the French cup in 1989 and reached the final of the Champions League in 1991. In 1992, he was transferred the highest in the history of football, when he left Olympique de Marseille for A.C. Milan with which he scored the Serie A-Champions League double in 1994. He joined Bayern Munich, with which he won the Europa League in 1996. He returned to France, to Bordeaux where he was a finalist in the League cup in 1997 and 1998 and then ended his professional career at Guingamp.

Capped 54 times and captain of the France team 11 times, Jean-Pierre Papin won the bronze medal at the 1986 World Cup and competed in Euro 1992. Injuries and the emergence of the Zinedine Zidane  generation moved away from the selection and his international career ended in the mid-1990s. He was not retained in the French selections which reached the semi-finals of Euro 1996 and won the 1998 World Cup.

In 1996, after their eight-month-old daughter was shown to have serious cerebral lesions, Jean-Pierre and his wife set up an association "Neuf de Coeur" (Nine of Hearts; Papin's shirt number was 9) to help others in that situation and, particularly, to find and apply methods to mentally and physically educate such children.

Early life 
Born in Boulogne-sur-Mer in 1963, Papin was the son of a professional football player, Guy Papin. After his parents divorced, he moved to live with his grandmother in Germont, a French city located near the Belgian border.

Club career 
At age 15, Papin started his professional career with Valenciennes, in Northern France, before moving to Club Brugge in Belgium.

Papin had a very successful first season at Club Brugge, scoring 32 goals in 43 games. Although he only played one season for Club Brugge, he was elected as its greatest ever foreign player by the supporters in 2008.

At club level, he played for Valenciennes (1984–1985), Club Brugge (1985–1986), Marseille (1986–1992), AC Milan (1992–1994), Bayern Munich (1994–1996), Bordeaux (1996–1998), Guingamp (1998–1999) and Saint-Pierroise (1999–2001).

Marseille 
During Papin's hugely successful spell at Marseille, with the Frenchman as striker and skipper Marseille won four French league championships in a row (1989–1992), a league and cup double in 1989 and reached the final of the European Cup in 1991, losing to Red Star Belgrade after on penalties.

During this period, Papin scored 181 goals in 279 games and was the league's top scorer for five consecutive seasons (from 1988 to 1992). While at Marseille he won the Ballon d'Or, awarded to Europe's top footballer, in 1991.

AC Milan 
In July 1992, Papin joined Italian giants AC Milan for a world record fee of £10 million, and was the first high-profile French player to join the Italian league since Michel Platini. However, he never established himself as a regular first team member with the rossoneri due to injuries and adaptation problems. As a foreign player in the Pre-Bosman rule era, Papin also suffered from the three-foreigner rule that made him compete for playing time with other foreign players such as Ruud Gullit, Marco van Basten, Frank Rijkaard, Dejan Savićević, Zvonimir Boban, Brian Laudrup, Florin Răducioiu, and Marcel Desailly.

He entered as a substitute during the 1993 Champions League final in which Milan lost to his former club, Marseille. He won the Champions League in the next year, but did not play in the final. Nevertheless, Papin has kept good memories of his spell in Italy and frequently cites former Milan managers Fabio Capello and Arrigo Sacchi as his models when coaching is concerned.

Bayern Munich 
In 1994, he was transferred to Bayern Munich for £2.1 million, but his first season was once again plagued by injuries. In his second season in Germany he was part of the side that won the UEFA Cup against Bordeaux, a club that Papin would join the following season.

Later career 
With Bordeaux, he lost the 1997 Coupe de la Ligue final against Strasbourg. Papin's professional career ended in 1998 with Second Division side Guingamp.

He was twice linked with clubs in England later in his playing career. First, in March 1994, he was a transfer target for Premier League side Tottenham Hotspur. Towards the end of his spell with Bordeaux in 1998, he was a target for ambitious Fulham, then a Division Two (third tier) side, and even expressed his desire to sign for the club. However, neither transfer ever happened and Papin finished his career without having spent any time in England.

Papin finished his career as a player in the amateur club US Cap-Ferret between 2001 and 2004. Then, after five years of managing, he played in another amateur club, AS Facture-Biganos Boïen.

International career 
Papin scored 30 goals for France in 54 matches.

Papin earned his first cap in a friendly match against Northern Ireland in February 1986 and appeared at the 1986 World Cup. He scored twice in four games: first during France opening game against Canada (1–0) and then during France's victory against Belgium (4–2), helping France finish third.

While Papin scored an impressive number of goals during his nine-year international career, his record for France is a mixed one. Papin was part of the "cursed generation" of French players that came between the Platini era of the 80's and the 1998 world champions boasting the likes of Zidane, Thuram and Henry. Despite some talented players, the France national team failed to qualify for the 1988 European Championship and for 1990 and 1994 World Cups – the latter after two humiliating defeats on home soil against Israel and Bulgaria.

The French team did manage to qualify for the Euro 1992 in Sweden, with Papin scoring 9 goals during the qualifying round. However, France fared disappointingly in the final competition and did not make it past the group stage, despite Papin scoring twice.

His last game for the national team was in 1995.

Style of play 
Papin has been described as "a fast and lethal striker, who made goal scoring his signature for club and country" and a player who could score in a variety of situation, "from neat, chipped finishes, low drives into the corner, towering headers and, in particular, thumping volleys."

During his career, the term Papinade was used to describe powerful volleys from difficult angles.

Managerial career 
In May 2006, Papin took over from Jacky Duguépéroux as the new coach of RC Strasbourg, who were relegated to the Second Division. He had previously been coaching FC Bassin d'Arcachon, an amateur team, and helped them to be promoted from CFA 2 to CFA.

In 2006–07, he guided Strasbourg back to Ligue 1 with a third-placed finish but came under pressure shortly after the end of the season when internal conflicts at the club surfaced in the press. Several players, including '05 league cup final hero Jean-Christophe Devaux, also openly criticized Papin's methods.

Initially confirmed as manager for the 2007–08 season, he was forced to resign a week later after it was revealed that he had interviewed for the vacant managerial job at RC Lens only hours after his confirmation at Strasbourg. He was replaced by Jean-Marc Furlan, former manager of Troyes, while Lens selected Guy Roux as their new manager. Ironically, Papin eventually became the manager of Lens after the club lost at Strasbourg, as Roux resigned only five games into the 2007–08 season. In the midst of the season, Lens and Papin were fighting to avoid relegation to the Second Division. Lens was also eliminated in the first round of both the UEFA cup and the Coupe de France by, respectively, FC Copenhagen (1–1; 1–2) and Second Division side Chamois Niortais (0–1, at home).

On 29 December 2009, Châteauroux hired the coach to replace Dominique Bijotat. He left his position in May 2010 and was replaced by Didier Tholot.

For the 2014–15 season, Papin once again took the managerial position at FC Bassin d'Archachon in Championnat de France Amateur 2.

On 2 June 2020, Papin was announced as the new manager of Championnat National 2 side C'Chartres.

He left his position in October 2022 to go back to Marseille as a technical advisor.

Outside football 

Papin was also iconic in French pop culture because of his caricature in the satirical TV puppet show Les Guignols de l'Info. At first, Papin was depicted as a rather dumb football player (a common stereotype in France), his only obsession being the many different ways to score goals. When Papin experienced difficulties in Italy, the coverage became more sympathetic, especially with the infamous Reviens JPP ! song where even God Himself would urge Papin to come back to his home country, because "France needs you !".

After his daughter, Emily, was diagnosed with cerebral palsy as an infant, Papin started running the Neuf de cœur (Nine of Hearts) foundation, which provides support to families affected by the neurological disorder.

Career statistics

Club

International

Scores and results list France's goal tally first, score column indicates score after each Papin goal.

Honours
Club Brugge
 Belgian Cup: 1985–86

Marseille
 Division 1: 1988–89, 1989–90, 1990–91, 1991–92
 Coupe de France: 1988–89
 European Cup runner-up: 1990–91

AC Milan
 Serie A: 1992–93, 1993–94
 Supercoppa Italiana: 1992, 1993
UEFA Champions League: 1993–94; runner-up: 1992–93

Bayern Munich
 UEFA Cup: 1995–96

France
 Kirin Cup: 1994
 FIFA World Cup third place: 1986

Individual

 Division 1 top scorer 1987–88, 1988–89, 1989–90, 1990–91, 1991–92
 Onze de Bronze: 1989, 1990, 1992
 European Cup top scorer: 1989–90, 1990–91, 1991–92
 Onze d'Or: 1991
 Ballon d'Or: 1991
 FIFA World Player of the Year Silver award: 1991
 IFFHS World's Top Goal Scorer: 1991
 Goal of the Year (Germany): 1995
 FIFA XI: 1997, 1998, 1999
 FIFA 100: 2004
 Voted best foreign player of Club Brugge ever: 2008
 Named Joueur du Siècle (player of the century) of Olympique de Marseille
 Équipe type spéciale 20 ans des trophées UNFP: 2011
 Golden Foot: 2013, as football legend
 The Dream Team 110 years of OM: 2010
 8th French Player of the Century

Orders
Knight of the Legion of Honour: 2005

References

External links

 

1963 births
Living people
People from Boulogne-sur-Mer
Sportspeople from Pas-de-Calais
French footballers
Association football forwards
INF Vichy players
Valenciennes FC players
Club Brugge KV players
Olympique de Marseille players
A.C. Milan players
FC Bayern Munich footballers
FC Girondins de Bordeaux players
En Avant Guingamp players
JS Saint-Pierroise players
Ligue 2 players
Belgian Pro League players
Ligue 1 players
Serie A players
Bundesliga players
UEFA Champions League winning players
UEFA Cup winning players
UEFA Champions League top scorers
Ballon d'Or winners
France international footballers
1986 FIFA World Cup players
UEFA Euro 1992 players
FIFA 100
French expatriate footballers
French expatriate sportspeople in Belgium
French expatriate sportspeople in Italy
French expatriate sportspeople in Germany
Expatriate footballers in Belgium
Expatriate footballers in Italy
Expatriate footballers in Germany
French football managers
RC Strasbourg Alsace managers
RC Lens managers
LB Châteauroux managers
C'Chartres Football managers
Ligue 1 managers
Championnat National 2 managers
Chevaliers of the Légion d'honneur
Footballers from Hauts-de-France